Shipai is the name of many places in China and Taiwan.

 Shipai, Dongguan, a town in Guangdong Province, China
 Shipai, Hunan, a place in Hunan Province, China
 Shipai, Hubei, a place in Hubei Province, China
 Shipai, Taipei, a place in Beitou District, Taipei, Taiwan
 Shipai, Yilan, a place in northern Taiwan on the boundary of New Taipei City and Yilan County

The following railway stations are named Shipai:
Shipai railway station, Guangzhou, China
Shipai metro station, Taipei, Taiwan